The Wadjalang, also known as the Dharawala,  were an indigenous Australian people of Queensland.

Language
According to Norman Tindale, the vocabularies collected by E. M. Curr from two local informants, L. F. Dalhunty and James Crombie, probably are derived from the language once spoken by the Wadjalang.

Country
In Tindale's estimation, the Wadjalang tribal lands encompassed some  taking in the headwaters of the Bulloo and Langlo rivers, and ran north from Quilpie to Northampton Downs to the east of Blackall, and to Tambo, The eastern boundaries were set at Cheepie, Burrandilla, and the Nive Downs. Also included in their traditional lands were Ambathalla and Minnie Downs.

Customs
Male circumcision had no place in Wadjalang initiation ceremonies.

Notes

Citations

Sources

Aboriginal peoples of Queensland